The Perovo Constituency (No.204) is a Russian legislative constituency in Moscow. It is based in Eastern Moscow.

Members elected

Election results

1993

|-
! colspan=2 style="background-color:#E9E9E9;text-align:left;vertical-align:top;" |Candidate
! style="background-color:#E9E9E9;text-align:left;vertical-align:top;" |Party
! style="background-color:#E9E9E9;text-align:right;" |Votes
! style="background-color:#E9E9E9;text-align:right;" |%
|-
|style="background-color:"|
|align=left|Aleksandr Osovtsov
|align=left|Independent
|38,742
|15.71%
|-
|style="background-color:"|
|align=left|Igor Zaslavsky
|align=left|Independent
| -
|11.08%
|-
| colspan="5" style="background-color:#E9E9E9;"|
|- style="font-weight:bold"
| colspan="3" style="text-align:left;" | Total
| 246,540
| 100%
|-
| colspan="5" style="background-color:#E9E9E9;"|
|- style="font-weight:bold"
| colspan="4" |Source:
|
|}

1995

|-
! colspan=2 style="background-color:#E9E9E9;text-align:left;vertical-align:top;" |Candidate
! style="background-color:#E9E9E9;text-align:left;vertical-align:top;" |Party
! style="background-color:#E9E9E9;text-align:right;" |Votes
! style="background-color:#E9E9E9;text-align:right;" |%
|-
|style="background-color:"|
|align=left|Valery Borshchyov
|align=left|Yabloko
|80,533
|28.04%
|-
|style="background-color:"|
|align=left|Konstantin Zhukov
|align=left|Communist Party
|34,873
|12.14%
|-
|style="background-color:#EE2D2A"|
|align=left|Galina Andreeva
|align=left|Block of Djuna
|19,336
|6.73%
|-
|style="background-color:#DA2021"|
|align=left|Igor Ilyinsky
|align=left|Ivan Rybkin Bloc
|14,065
|4.90%
|-
|style="background-color:#E98282"|
|align=left|Elmira Abdurakhmanova
|align=left|Women of Russia
|11,433
|3.98%
|-
|style="background-color:#F21A29"|
|align=left|Andrey Lebedev
|align=left|Trade Unions and Industrialists – Union of Labour
|10,293
|3.58%
|-
|style="background-color:#019CDC"|
|align=left|Vladimir Chernov
|align=left|Party of Russian Unity and Accord
|10,122
|3.52%
|-
|style="background-color:"|
|align=left|Viktor Kruglyakov
|align=left|Independent
|9,756
|3.40%
|-
|style="background-color:"|
|align=left|Sergey Mavrodi
|align=left|Independent
|8,648
|3.01%
|-
|style="background-color:"|
|align=left|Aleksandr Makarov
|align=left|Independent
|8,153
|2.84%
|-
|style="background-color:#D50000"|
|align=left|Yury Khudyakov
|align=left|Communists and Working Russia - for the Soviet Union
|7,879
|2.74%
|-
|style="background-color:"|
|align=left|Ivan Shevchenko
|align=left|Independent
|4,749
|1.65%
|-
|style="background-color:#959698"|
|align=left|Vladimir Shanygin
|align=left|Derzhava
|4,610
|1.61%
|-
|style="background-color:"|
|align=left|Viktor Lyubin
|align=left|Power to the People!
|4,395
|1.53%
|-
|style="background-color:"|
|align=left|Vasily Simchera
|align=left|Liberal Democratic Party
|4,234
|1.47%
|-
|style="background-color:"|
|align=left|Tatyana Ivanova
|align=left|Agrarian Party
|3,844
|1.34%
|-
|style="background-color:#F5821F"|
|align=left|Yevgeny Yagupets
|align=left|Bloc of Independents
|1,182
|0.41%
|-
|style="background-color:#000000"|
|colspan=2 |against all
|43,569
|15.17%
|-
| colspan="5" style="background-color:#E9E9E9;"|
|- style="font-weight:bold"
| colspan="3" style="text-align:left;" | Total
| 287,191
| 100%
|-
| colspan="5" style="background-color:#E9E9E9;"|
|- style="font-weight:bold"
| colspan="4" |Source:
|
|}

1999

|-
! colspan=2 style="background-color:#E9E9E9;text-align:left;vertical-align:top;" |Candidate
! style="background-color:#E9E9E9;text-align:left;vertical-align:top;" |Party
! style="background-color:#E9E9E9;text-align:right;" |Votes
! style="background-color:#E9E9E9;text-align:right;" |%
|-
|style="background-color:#3B9EDF"|
|align=left|Valery Ryazansky
|align=left|Fatherland – All Russia
|88,161
|29.46%
|-
|style="background-color:"|
|align=left|Valery Borshchyov (incumbent)
|align=left|Yabloko
|66,633
|22.27%
|-
|style="background-color:#FF4400"|
|align=left|Natalia Barmina-Sidorova
|align=left|Andrey Nikolayev and Svyatoslav Fyodorov Bloc
|23,075
|7.71%
|-
|style="background-color:#084284"|
|align=left|Vyacheslav Gerasimov
|align=left|Spiritual Heritage
|15,251
|5.10%
|-
|style="background-color:"|
|align=left|Ivan Kuzmin
|align=left|Independent
|12,834
|4.29%
|-
|style="background-color:#020266"|
|align=left|Igor Voskresensky
|align=left|Russian Socialist Party
|10,772
|3.60%
|-
|style="background-color:#000000"|
|colspan=2 |against all
|72,714
|24.30%
|-
| colspan="5" style="background-color:#E9E9E9;"|
|- style="font-weight:bold"
| colspan="3" style="text-align:left;" | Total
| 299,245
| 100%
|-
| colspan="5" style="background-color:#E9E9E9;"|
|- style="font-weight:bold"
| colspan="4" |Source:
|
|}

2003

|-
! colspan=2 style="background-color:#E9E9E9;text-align:left;vertical-align:top;" |Candidate
! style="background-color:#E9E9E9;text-align:left;vertical-align:top;" |Party
! style="background-color:#E9E9E9;text-align:right;" |Votes
! style="background-color:#E9E9E9;text-align:right;" |%
|-
|style="background-color:"|
|align=left|Valery Ryazansky (incumbent)
|align=left|United Russia
|101,082
|40.58%
|-
|style="background-color:"|
|align=left|Valery Borshchyov
|align=left|Yabloko
|48,552
|19.49%
|-
|style="background-color:"|
|align=left|Yaroslav Sidorov
|align=left|Communist Party
|20,080
|8.06%
|-
|style="background-color:#164C8C"|
|align=left|Vagiz Khidiyatullin
|align=left|United Russian Party Rus'
|9,163
|3.68%
|-
|style="background-color:"|
|align=left|Oleg Bolgov
|align=left|Liberal Democratic Party
|8,725
|3.50%
|-
|style="background-color:#00A1FF"|
|align=left|Viktor Malinin
|align=left|Party of Russia's Rebirth-Russian Party of Life
|7,618
|3.06%
|-
|style="background-color:#000000"|
|colspan=2 |against all
|48,471
|19.46%
|-
| colspan="5" style="background-color:#E9E9E9;"|
|- style="font-weight:bold"
| colspan="3" style="text-align:left;" | Total
| 250,609
| 100%
|-
| colspan="5" style="background-color:#E9E9E9;"|
|- style="font-weight:bold"
| colspan="4" |Source:
|
|}

2016

|-
! colspan=2 style="background-color:#E9E9E9;text-align:left;vertical-align:top;" |Candidate
! style="background-color:#E9E9E9;text-align:left;vertical-align:top;" |Party
! style="background-color:#E9E9E9;text-align:right;" |Votes
! style="background-color:#E9E9E9;text-align:right;" |%
|-
|style="background-color:"|
|align=left|Sergey Zheleznyak
|align=left|United Russia
|74,854
|44.35%
|-
|style="background-color:"|
|align=left|Aleksandr Timchenko
|align=left|Communist Party
|19,225
|11.39%
|-
|style="background-color:"|
|align=left|Igor Bayko
|align=left|Liberal Democratic Party
|15,224
|9.02%
|-
|style="background-color:"|
|align=left|Maksim Kruglov
|align=left|Yabloko
|12,463
|7.38%
|-
|style="background-color:"|
|align=left|Aleksandr Korsunov
|align=left|A Just Russia
|8,252
|4.89%
|-
|style="background:"| 
|align=left|Olga Lukhtan
|align=left|The Greens
|7,995
|4.74%
|-
|style="background:;"| 
|align=left|Aleksey Balabutkin
|align=left|Communists of Russia
|5,866
|3.48%
|-
|style="background-color:"|
|align=left|Yelena Badak
|align=left|Party of Growth
|5,122
|3.03%
|-
|style="background:"|
|align=left|Vladimir Zalishchak
|align=left|People's Freedom Party
|4,740
|2.81%
|-
|style="background:"| 
|align=left|Igor Yerin
|align=left|Patriots of Russia
|4,059
|2.40%
|-
|style="background-color:"|
|align=left|Dmitry Kasmin
|align=left|Rodina
|3,695
|2.19%
|-
|style="background:#00A650;"| 
|align=left|Maksim Shemyakin
|align=left|Civilian Power
|2,213
|1.31%
|-
| colspan="5" style="background-color:#E9E9E9;"|
|- style="font-weight:bold"
| colspan="3" style="text-align:left;" | Total
| 168,793
| 100%
|-
| colspan="5" style="background-color:#E9E9E9;"|
|- style="font-weight:bold"
| colspan="4" |Source:
|
|}

2021

|-
! colspan=2 style="background-color:#E9E9E9;text-align:left;vertical-align:top;" |Candidate
! style="background-color:#E9E9E9;text-align:left;vertical-align:top;" |Party
! style="background-color:#E9E9E9;text-align:right;" |Votes
! style="background-color:#E9E9E9;text-align:right;" |%
|-
|style="background-color: " |
|align=left|Tatyana Butskaya
|align=left|United Russia
|101,785
|39.35%
|-
|style="background-color: " |
|align=left|Sergey Kurgansky
|align=left|Communist Party
|53,315
|20.61%
|-
|style="background-color: " |
|align=left|Ksenia Domozhirova
|align=left|A Just Russia — For Truth
|15,951
|6.17%
|-
|style="background-color: "|
|align=left|Nikolay Dvorak
|align=left|Party of Pensioners
|12,667
|4.90%
|-
|style="background-color: "|
|align=left|Valentin Ignatyev
|align=left|New People
|11,970
|4.63%
|-
|style="background-color: " |
|align=left|Yury Kurganov
|align=left|Communists of Russia
|11,775
|4.55%
|-
|style="background-color: " |
|align=left|Mikhail Monakhov
|align=left|Liberal Democratic Party
|10,292
|3.98%
|-
|style="background: ;"| 
|align=left|Vasily Prokhanov
|align=left|Rodina
|8,659
|3.35%
|-
|style="background-color: " |
|align=left|Nikolay Kavkazsky
|align=left|Yabloko
|7,248
|2.80%
|-
|style="background-color: "|
|align=left|Mikhail Gromyko
|align=left|Russian Party of Freedom and Justice
|5,529
|2.14%
|-
|style="background: ;"| 
|align=left|Konstantin Presnyakov
|align=left|The Greens
|5,331
|2.06%
|-
|style="background: ;"| 
|align=left|Anton Shuvalov
|align=left|Green Alternative
|3,418
|1.32%
|-
|style="background-color: " |
|align=left|Aleksey Yashin
|align=left|Party of Growth
|2,860
|1.11%
|-
|style="background: ;"| 
|align=left|Sergey Izmaylov
|align=left|Civic Platform
|2,542
|0.98%
|-
| colspan="5" style="background-color:#E9E9E9;"|
|- style="font-weight:bold"
| colspan="3" style="text-align:left;" | Total
| 258,665
| 100%
|-
| colspan="5" style="background-color:#E9E9E9;"|
|- style="font-weight:bold"
| colspan="4" |Source:
|
|}

Notes

Sources
204. Перовский одномандатный избирательный округ

References

Russian legislative constituencies
Politics of Moscow